The 74th running of the Tour of Flanders cycling classic was held on Sunday, 1 April 1990. Italian Moreno Argentin won the race in a two-man sprint with Rudy Dhaenens. 102 of 194 riders finished the race.

Race report
The race was run in exceptionally warm and sunny April weather. Italian Fabio Roscioli was the last survivor of an early breakaway, but was caught by a seven-man group on the Eikenberg. 30 from the finish, Laurent Fignon and Per Pedersen broke away from the group, but were counterattacked and dropped by Moreno Argentin and Rudy Dhaenens. Argentin, a four-time winner of Liège–Bastogne–Liège easily won the two-man sprint.

Route
The race started in Sint-Niklaas and finished in Meerbeke (Ninove) – totaling 262 km.
The course featured 13 categorized climbs:

Results

External links
 Video of the 1990 Tour of Flanders  on Sporza (in Dutch)

References

1990
1990 in road cycling
1990 in Belgian sport
1990 UCI Road World Cup
April 1990 sports events in Europe